Nicolae Simache (November 5, 1905 –  January 6, 1972) was a  Romanian professor, historian and publicist. In 1963, he founded a clock museum named Nicolae Simache Clock Museum in Ploieşti, Romania.

Publications

 Pinacoteca municipiului Ploieşti, 1939;
 Despre letopiseţul Cantacuzinesc, 1942;
 Istoriografia română şi problemele editării cronicilor, 1942;
 Ştiinţa geografică a lui Herodot despre ţinuturile noastre, 1942;
 Variante ale letopiseţului Cantacuzinesc, 1942;
 Viaţa şi opera lui Radu Popescu, 1943;
 Despre Revoluţia de la 1848 în Ploieşti şi judeţul Prahova, 1948;
 Contribuţii la răscoala poporului român sub conducerea lui Tudor Vladimirescu, 1957;
 Din trecutul regiunii Ploieşti, 1957;
 O străveche aşezare din regiunea Ploieşti: Târgşor, 1957;
 Casa Hagi Prodan, 1966;
 Casa Dobrescu, 1966;
 Ceasul de-a lungul vremii, 1967;
 Chipuri şi locuri din regiunea Ploieşti, în grafica secolelor XVI-XIX, 1967;
 Muzeul Memorial B.P. Haşdeu - Câmpina, 1967;
 Muzeul memorial Nicolae Iorga, 1967;
 Caragiale şi Ploieştii, 1968;
 Drumuri turistice la sud-estul Carpaţilor, 1968;
 Muzeul tiparului şi al cărţii vechi româneşti - Târgovişte, 1968;
 Casa Nicolae Iorga, 1969;
 Contribuţii la istoricul oraşelor Ploieşti şi Târgovişte, 1962;
 Contribuţii la istoricul satelor Poseşti, Râncezi şi Nucşoara, 1969;
 Contribuţii la monografia comunei Starchiojd, 1969;
 Anul revoluţionar 1848 în judeţul Prahova, 1969;
 Din viaţa şi opera lui Cezar Petrescu, 1969;
 Documente privitoare la istoria comunei Starchiojd, 1969;
 Un orientalist ploieştean, Gh. Popescu-Ciocănel, 1969;
 Ştergarul prahovean, 1970;
 Dantela de mână, 1970;
 Date noi privind viaţa şi opera lui Cincinat Pavelescu, 1970;
 Noi contribuţii la studiul situaţiei ţăranilor după aplicarea Regulamentului Organic în fostul judeţ al săcuienilor, 1970;
 Istoricul tipografiilor prahovene, 1970;
 Colecţia de covoare a Muzeului de Istorie, 1971;
 Documente de pe Valea Teleajenului, 1971;
 File de istorie din trecutul comunei Teişani, 1971.

References

1905 births
1972 deaths
People from Ploiești
University of Bucharest alumni